Edmund Needham Morrill (February 12, 1834 – March 14, 1909) was a U.S. Congressman from Kansas and the 13th Governor of Kansas.

Biography
Edmund Needham Morrill was born in Westbrook, Maine, to Rufus and Mary (Webb) Morrill. He attended the common schools at Westbrook Academy and learned the trade of tanning from his father. At the age of 23, he moved to Kansas.

In 1861, he enlisted as a private in Company C, 7th Kansas Cavalry. Within a year, he was a captain, and by 1865 he was a major.

After the Civil War, he entered the banking business and remained in that business for the rest of his life.

Morrill married twice, first to Elizabeth A. Brettum whom he married on November 27, 1862. Elizabeth died November 1868 at Hiawatha, Kansas.  Morrill's second wife was Caroline Jenkins Nash, whom he married December 25, 1869.  They had three children, all born at Hiawatha.

In 1866, he was elected clerk of the district court. In 1872, he was elected to the Kansas Senate. He was elected to the United States House of Representatives in 1882, serving four two-year terms before declining another, announcing instead his retirement from politics.  Nevertheless, at the urging of his friends, he accepted the nomination for governor of Kansas in 1894 and served one term, being defeated in 1896.

Morrill died March 14, 1909, in San Antonio, Texas, and is buried in Hiawatha's Mount Hope Cemetery.

References

 Blackmar, Frank W.  Kansas: A Cyclopedia of State History, Embracing Events, Institutions, Industries, Counties, Cities, Towns, Prominent Persons, Etc. (Chicago: Standard Publishing Company), 1912.
 Morrill, E. N.  History and Statistics of Brown County, Kansas (Hiawatha, KS: s.n.), 1876.

External links

Publications concerning Kansas Governor Morrill's administration available via the KGI Online Library
History of Brown County, Kansas compiled by Maj. E.N. Morrill

Republican Party governors of Kansas
Republican Party Kansas state senators
1834 births
1909 deaths
Politicians from Westbrook, Maine
People from Hiawatha, Kansas
American Congregationalists
Republican Party members of the United States House of Representatives from Kansas
19th-century American politicians